Daisy E. Devan (1928-2009) was a Singaporean businesswoman, called "Singapore's Mother Music". She was inducted into the Singapore Women's Hall of Fame posthumously, in 2018.

Early life 
Devan was born in Malaya, the daughter of Indian parents.

Career 
Devan worked in the rubber industry with Société des Matieres Premieres Tropicales, before becoming involved in the music business. She opened Singapore's first recording studio, established Singapore's first record-pressing factory at Jurong, and was Artistes and Repertoire Manager of EMI in Singapore beginning in 1957.

In addition to popular music, Devan recorded traditional Malaysian music in various languages and genres. In 1965, she produced the first official recording of Singapore's new national anthem. After she retired from the music business in 1981, she and her husband ran a health food store.

Devan was one of the founders of Singapore's Business and Professional Women’s Club. She was a judge for Discovery Talentime 1975, a musical talent contest on Radio Television Singapore.

Personal life and legacy 
Daisy Devan was married to Albert Devan. She had been a widow for sixteen years when she died at her home in Clementi in 2009, aged 81 years. In 2017, a program about Devan, When Mother Music Comes to Tea by Khir Johari, was featured at the Singapore International Festival of Arts. In 2018, she was posthumously inducted into the Singapore Women's Hall of Fame.

References

External links 

 Sarena Hashim, "EMI, Where Dreams Came True" Reminiscences (May 5, 2014). A blogpost about Devan, by one of the artists she mentored.

1928 births
2009 deaths
Singaporean Christians
Singaporean women in business
Music industry executives